The Eternal Magdalene is a 1919 American film adapted from a play by Robert H. McLaughlin. The film was produced by Goldwyn Pictures.

Julia Arthur portrayed the title character in the play. It was published by Clark Copp.

One critic described McLaughlin as among problem playwriters and stated he believed the "harlot's place is in the home."

Cast
 Maxine Hicks
 Marguerite Marsh as Elizabeth Bradshaw
 Charles Dalton
 Charles Trowbridge
 Donald Gallaher
 Maud Cooling
 Vernon Steele as Preacher

Gallery

References

1919 films
American silent films
1910s American films